Stadion Miejskiego Ośrodka Sportu i Rekreacji w Stalowej Woli, commonly referred to as Stadion MOSiR, is a sports stadium and former football stadium in Stalowa Wola, Poland.  It was the home for Stal Stalowa Wola until the club moved to the Podkarpackie Centrum Piłki Nożnej in 2020. Currently, the Stalowa Wola's  supervises, among others, the athletics stadium located in the vicinity of the San River and sports halls near Hutnicza Street.

History
The stadium was one of the first buildings in Stalowa Wola built in the late 1930s, with a maximum capacity of 12,000. The stadium was renovated in 1968 and 2006. In 1994 it hosted Legia Warsaw, in the Stal Stalowa Wola's 1–0 Ekstraklasa victory in front of the record 12,000 attendance.

After the seats were installed, the stadium's capacity was reduced to 10,000. At the time of the demolition of the last stands, the capacity was 2,937. The demolition works lasted until 2016. Then, in 2016, the construction of the Podkarpackie Centrum Piłki Nożnej began. Until the opening of the new arena in 2020, a tiny fragment of the arch with the visitors sector has been preserved.

In July 2020, the Subcarpathian Polish Athletic Association qualifying meeting was held at the Stadion MOSiR.

References

External links
  MOSiR Stalowa Wola website
  Stadion MOSiR (Stalowa Wola) at stadiony.net

Stalowa Wola
Stal Stalowa Wola
Sports venues in Podkarpackie Voivodeship